Petter Myhre (born 21 February 1972) is a retired Norwegian footballer and current assistant coach for Lillestrøm.

During his active career he played for Strømmen IF, Ullern IF and Skjetten SK. He also took education at the Norwegian School of Sport Sciences.

From 2002 he coached the junior team and reserves team of Vålerenga, and also played sporadic matches. He was promoted to assistant coach of the first team in 2006, and mid-season he was promoted to head coach. He lasted until July 2007. Ahead of the 2009 season he was named as co-coach of Strømmen IF together with Thomas Berntsen. On 24 January 2020 Myhre became assistant coach for Lillestrøm.

He also commentates football on the Norwegian TV channel TV 2.

References

1967 births
Living people
Norwegian footballers
Ullern IF players
Strømmen IF players
Skjetten SK players
Norwegian First Division players
Norwegian football managers
Vålerenga Fotball managers
Norwegian School of Sport Sciences alumni
Norwegian association football commentators
Association football midfielders
Strømmen IF managers